Iapetonudus is an extinct genus of conodonts.

Like other members of its genus, Iapetognathus fluctivagus had ramiform (branching) array of elements (apparatus). It is believed that the ramiform apparatus in Iapetognathus fluctivagus evolved from the coniform (cone-like) apparatus of Iapetonudus ibexensis.

See also 
 Iapetus Ocean, an ocean that existed in the late Neoproterozoic and early Paleozoic eras of the geologic timescale (between 600 and 400 million years ago)

References

External links 

Proconodontida genera
Early Ordovician animals
Ordovician conodonts